William Wallace Hayward Nash (22 September 1884 – 24 July 1977) was an English cricketer. Nash's batting style is unknown. He was born at Quedgeley, Gloucestershire.

Nash made his first-class debut for Gloucestershire against Cambridge University in 1905. He made two further first-class appearances for the county, both in the 1906 County Championship, against Kent and Sussex. In his three first-class matches for Gloucestershire, he scored a total of 81 runs at an average of 16.20, with a high score of 34.

He died at Minchinhampton, Gloucestershire, on 24 July 1971.

References

External links
William Nash at ESPNcricinfo
William Nash at CricketArchive

1884 births
1971 deaths
Cricketers from Gloucestershire
English cricketers
Gloucestershire cricketers
People from Stroud District